Lucien Vlaemynck (19 August 1914 – 14 June 1994) was a Belgian professional road bicycle racer. Vlaemynck rode his only Tour de France in 1939, when he finished third overall. He also finished in third place in the 1946 Paris–Roubaix.

Major results

1937
Criterium du Midi
1938
Tour de Luxembourg
1939
Cannes
GP de l'Exposition de Liège (with Félicien Vervaecke)
Tour de France:
3rd place overall classification
1942
Micheroux
1943
GP de l'Auto
1944
Flèche Française (with Robert Bonnaventure, Emile Idée and Mickael Schmitt)
1945
Circuit de Paris
Sint-Lambrechts-Woluwe
Moorslede
1946
Kortijk
Waregem

References

External links 

Official Tour de France results for Lucien Vlaemynck

1914 births
1994 deaths
Cyclists from West Flanders
Belgian male cyclists
People from Alveringem